

UN Russian Language Day is observed annually on June 6.  The event was established by the United Nations Educational, Scientific and Cultural Organization (UNESCO) in 2010. UN Russian Language Day coincides with the birthday of Alexander Pushkin, a Russian poet who is considered the father of modern Russian language.

The initiative of the UN Language Days was launched in February 2010 in order to celebrate multilingualism and cultural diversity and to promote equal use of all six of the UN's official working languages throughout the organization.

See also 
 International Mother Language Day
 International observance
 Official languages of the United Nations

References

External links 
 UN Russian Language Day - Official Site (Russian)

June observances
Russian language
Russian